O 4 was an  patrol submarine of the Royal Netherlands Navy. The ship was built by De Schelde shipyard in Flushing, Netherlands.

Service history
The submarine was ordered on 18 December 1911. On 15 June 1912 the O 4 was  laid down in Flushing at the shipyard of De Schelde. The launch took place on 5 August 1913.

A passive sonar and two retractable periscopes were installed on the ship making it the first submarine in the Dutch navy having this equipment.

On 17 June 1914 the ship was commissioned in the navy. During World War I the ship was based in Flushing. Queen Wilhelmina visited the ship on 22 December 1914.

In 1935 the O 4 was decommissioned.

References

External links
Description of ship

1913 ships
Ships built in Vlissingen
O 2-class submarines